Leslie Phillips (1924–2022) was an English actor.

Leslie Phillips may also refer to:

Leslie Phillips (cricketer) (1899–1979), English cricketer
Sam Phillips (musician) (born 1962), originally recorded under her birth name, "Leslie Phillips"
Les Phillips (born 1963), English football midfielder
Leslie Gordon Phillips (1892–1966), British Army officer